Aziz (born 1946) is an Indian artist and painter from Hyderabad, Andhra Pradesh.

Early life
Aziz was born in Hyderabad, India. He studied art at the College of Fine Art and Architecture in Hyderabad.

Works and exhibits
Since the 1980s, Aziz has exhibited in Europe, South Asia and South Africa.

Aziz has moved towards a new genre in his repertoire. He has used the three dimensional technique to create "Freedom Walk," a narrative rendering of a Mahatama Gandhi followed by Nelson Mandela, Jawarharlal Nehru, Indira Gandhi, and the Frontier Gandhi on the Juhu Beach being led by a young child symbolizing the future. It took him a month to create it but he has given it to the Indian High Commissioner to South Africa, HE Shri Virendra Gupta and it will now occupy a premium place in the High Commissioner's Office in Pretoria. This painting was created to mark "150 years of Indians in South Africa. On 29 December 2010 the idea of making: Freedom Walk a Commemorative Stamp, was shared with the President of India. On 2 October 2011, the Chief Postmaster General of Andhra Pradesh, was requested to work towards making: Freedom Walk a Commemorative Stamp.   There is a website especially created for this initiative.

See also
Faux painting

External links
 Aziz in South Africa 
 Aziz's brief profile on Dhoomimal Art Gallery webpage

Artists from Hyderabad, India
Living people
Indian portrait painters
1946 births
Painters from Andhra Pradesh
20th-century Indian painters
Indian male painters
20th-century Indian male artists